The European Junior Curling Challenge is an annual curling bonspiel held in the World Curling Federation's Europe zone. The championships feature curlers under the age of 21 competing to qualify for a spot in the World Junior Curling Championships. Nations that participate are those which have not already qualified for the World Junior Championships. Replacing the European Junior Curling Challenge and the Pacific-Asia Junior Curling Championships in 2016, the World Junior B Curling Championships will now serve as the qualifier for the World Junior Curling Championships.

Summary

Men

Women

Notes
  The Czech Republic defeated Italy in the silver medal game.
  Russia defeated France in the silver medal game.
  The Czech Republic defeated Sweden in the silver medal game.

References

External links
World Curling Federation Results Archives

 
European youth sports competitions
International curling competitions
Curling in Europe
Youth curling